This was the first edition of the tournament.

Andrei Vasilevski and Igor Zelenay won the title after defeating Ivan and Matej Sabanov 4–6, 6–4, [10–3] in the final.

Seeds

Draw

References

External links
 Main draw

Schwaben Open - Doubles